Raman Yaliotnau (born 10 May 1993) is a Belarusian biathlete. He competed in the 2018 Winter Olympics.

Biathlon results
All results are sourced from the International Biathlon Union.

Olympic Games
0 medals

*The mixed relay was added as an event in 2014.

World Championships
0 medals

*During Olympic seasons competitions are only held for those events not included in the Olympic program.
**The mixed relay was added as an event in 2005.

References

1993 births
Living people
People from Chavusy District
Belarusian male biathletes
Olympic biathletes of Belarus
Biathletes at the 2018 Winter Olympics
Sportspeople from Mogilev Region